Psychological trauma, mental trauma or psychotrauma is an emotional response to a distressing event or series of events, such as accidents, rape, or natural disasters. Reactions such as psychological shock and psychological denial are typical. Longer-term reactions include unpredictable emotions, flashbacks, difficulties with interpersonal relationships and sometimes physical symptoms including headaches or nausea.

Trauma is not the same as mental distress or suffering, both of which are universal human experiences.

Given that subjective experiences differ between individuals, people will react to similar events differently. In other words, not all people who experience a potentially traumatic event will actually become psychologically traumatized (although they may be distressed and experience suffering). Some people will develop post-traumatic stress disorder (PTSD) after being exposed to a major traumatic event (or series of events). This discrepancy in risk rate can be attributed to protective factors some individuals may have that enable them to cope with difficult events, including temperamental and environmental factors (such as resilience and willingness to seek help).

Signs and symptoms

People who go through extremely traumatizing experiences often have problems and difficulties afterwards. The severity of these symptoms depends on the person, the types of trauma involved, and the emotional support they receive from others. The range of reactions to trauma can be wide and varied, and differ in severity from person to person.

After a traumatic experience, a person may re-experience the trauma mentally and physically.  For example, the sound of a motorcycle engine may cause intrusive thoughts or a sense of re-experiencing a traumatic experience that involved a similar sound (e.g., gunfire).  Sometimes a benign stimulus (e.g., noise from a motorcycle) may get connected in the mind with the traumatic experience.  This process is called traumatic coupling.  In this process, the benign stimulus becomes a trauma reminder, also called a trauma trigger.  These can produce uncomfortable and even painful feelings. Re-experiencing can damage people's sense of safety, self, self-efficacy, as well as their ability to regulate emotions and navigate relationships. They may turn to psychoactive substances including alcohol to try to escape or dampen the feelings. These triggers cause flashbacks, which are dissociative experiences where the person feels as though the events are recurring. Flashbacks can range from distraction to complete dissociation or loss of awareness of the current context. Re-experiencing of symptoms is a sign that the body and mind are actively struggling to cope with the traumatic experience.

Triggers and cues act as reminders of the trauma and can cause anxiety and other associated emotions. Often the person can be completely unaware of what these triggers are. In many cases, this may lead a person with a traumatic disorder to engage in disruptive behaviors or self-destructive coping mechanisms, often without being fully aware of the nature or causes of their own actions. Panic attacks are an example of a psychosomatic response to such emotional triggers.

Consequently, intense feelings of anger may frequently surface, sometimes in inappropriate or unexpected situations, as danger may always seem to be present due to re-experiencing past events. Upsetting memories such as images, thoughts, or flashbacks may haunt the person, and nightmares may be frequent. Insomnia may occur as lurking fears and insecurity keep the person vigilant and on the lookout for danger, both day and night. A messy personal financial scene, as well as debt, are common features in trauma-affected people. Trauma doesn't only cause changes in one's daily functions, but could also lead to morphological changes. Such epigenetic changes can be passed on to the next generation, thus making genetics one of the components of psychological trauma. However, some people are born with or later develop protective factors such as genetics that help lower their risk of psychological trauma.

The person may not remember what actually happened, while emotions experienced during the trauma may be re-experienced without the person understanding why (see Repressed Memory). This can lead to the traumatic events being constantly experienced as if they were happening in the present, preventing the subject from gaining perspective on the experience. This can produce a pattern of prolonged periods of acute arousal punctuated by periods of physical and mental exhaustion. This can lead to mental health disorders like acute stress and anxiety disorder, traumatic grief, undifferentiated somatoform disorder, conversion disorders, brief psychotic disorder, borderline personality disorder, adjustment disorder, etc. Obsessive- compulsive disorder is another mental health disorder with symptoms similar to that of psychological trauma, such as hyper-vigilance and intrusive thoughts. Research has indicated that individuals who have experienced a traumatic event have been known to use symptoms of obsessive- compulsive disorder, such as compulsive checking of safety, as a way to mitigate the symptoms associated with trauma.

In time, emotional exhaustion may set in, leading to distraction, and clear thinking may be difficult or impossible. Emotional detachment, as well as dissociation or "numbing out" can frequently occur. Dissociating from the painful emotion includes numbing all emotion, and the person may seem emotionally flat, preoccupied, distant, or cold. Dissociation includes depersonalisation disorder, dissociative amnesia, dissociative fugue, dissociative identity disorder, etc. Exposure to and re-experiencing trauma can cause neurophysiological changes like slowed myelination, abnormalities in synaptic pruning, shrinking of the hippocampus, cognitive and affective impairment. This is significant in brain scan studies done regarding higher-order function assessment with children and youth who were in vulnerable environments.

Some traumatized people may feel permanently damaged when trauma symptoms do not go away and they do not believe their situation will improve. This can lead to feelings of despair, transient paranoid ideation,  loss of self-esteem, profound emptiness, suicidality, and frequently, depression. If important aspects of the person's self and world understanding have been violated, the person may call their own identity into question.  Often despite their best efforts, traumatized parents may have difficulty assisting their child with emotion regulation, attribution of meaning, and containment of post-traumatic fear in the wake of the child's traumatization, leading to adverse consequences for the child. In such instances, seeking counselling in appropriate mental health services is in the best interests of both the child and the parent(s).

Causes

Situational trauma
Trauma can be caused by human-made, technological and natural disasters, including war, abuse, violence, mechanized accidents (such as vehicle accidents), or medical emergencies.

An individual's response to psychological trauma can be varied based on the type of trauma, as well as socio-demographic and background factors.
There are several behavioral responses commonly used towards stressors including the proactive, reactive, and passive responses. Proactive responses include attempts to address and correct a stressor before it has a noticeable effect on lifestyle.  Reactive responses occur after the stress and possible trauma has occurred and is aimed more at correcting or minimizing the damage of a stressful event.  A passive response is often characterized by an emotional numbness or ignorance of a stressor.

There is also a distinction between trauma induced by recent situations and long-term trauma which may have been buried in the unconscious from past situations such as childhood abuse. Trauma is sometimes overcome through healing; in some cases this can be achieved by recreating or revisiting the origin of the trauma under more psychologically safe circumstances, such as with a therapist. More recently, awareness of the consequences of climate change is seen as a source of trauma as individuals contemplate future events as well as experience climate change related disasters. Emotional experiences within these contexts are increasing, and collective processing and engagement with these emotions can lead to increased resilience and post traumatic growth, as well as a greater sense of belongingness. These outcomes are protective against the devastating impacts of psychological trauma.

Stress disorders

All psychological traumas originate from stress, a physiological response to an unpleasant stimulus. Long-term stress increases the risk of poor mental health and mental disorders, which can be attributed to secretion of glucocorticoids for a long period of time. Such prolonged exposure causes many physiological dysfunctions such as the suppression of the immune system and increase in blood pressure. Not only does it affect the body physiologically, but a morphological change in the hippocampus also takes place. Studies showed that extreme stress early in life can disrupt normal development of hippocampus and impact its functions in adulthood. Studies surely show a correlation between the size of hippocampus and one's susceptibility to stress disorders. In times of war, psychological trauma has been known as shell shock or combat stress reaction. Psychological trauma may cause an acute stress reaction which may lead to posttraumatic stress disorder (PTSD). PTSD emerged as the label for this condition after the Vietnam War in which many veterans returned to their respective countries demoralized, and sometimes, addicted to psychoactive substances.

The symptoms of PTSD must persist for at least one month for diagnosis to be made. The main symptoms of PTSD consist of four main categories: trauma (i.e. intense fear), reliving (i.e. flashbacks), avoidance behavior (i.e. emotional numbing), and hypervigilance (i.e. continuous scanning of the environment for danger). Research shows that about 60% of the US population reported as having experienced at least one traumatic symptom in their lives, but only a small proportion actually develops PTSD. There is a correlation between the risk of PTSD and whether or not the act was inflicted deliberately by the offender. Psychological trauma is treated with therapy and, if indicated, psychotropic medications.

The term continuous posttraumatic stress disorder (CTSD) was introduced into the trauma literature by Gill Straker (1987). It was originally used by South African clinicians to describe the effects of exposure to frequent, high levels of violence usually associated with civil conflict and political repression. The term is also applicable to the effects of exposure to contexts in which gang violence and crime are endemic as well as to the effects of ongoing exposure to life threats in high-risk occupations such as police, fire, and emergency services.

As one of the processes of treatment, confrontation with their sources of trauma plays a crucial role. While debriefing people immediately after a critical incident has not been shown to reduce incidence of PTSD, coming alongside people experiencing trauma in a supportive way has become standard practice.

Moral injury 
Moral injury is distress such as guilt or shame following a moral transgression. There are many other definitions some based on different models of causality. Moral injury is associated with post-traumatic stress disorder but is distinguished from it. Moral injury is associated with guilt and shame while PTSD is correlated with fear and anxiety.

Vicarious trauma
Vicarious trauma affects workers who witness their clients' trauma. It is more likely to occur in situations where trauma related work is the norm rather than the exception. Listening with empathy to the clients generates feeling, and seeing oneself in clients' trauma may compound the risk for developing trauma symptoms. Trauma may also result if workers witness situations that happen in the course of their work (e.g. violence in the workplace, reviewing violent video tapes.)  Risk increases with exposure and with the absence of help seeking protective factors and pre-preparation of preventive strategies. Individuals who have a personal history of trauma are also at increased risk for developing vicarious trauma.  Vicarious trauma can lead workers to develop more negative views of themselves, others, and the world as a whole, which can compromise their quality of life and ability to work effectively.

Theoretical models

Shattered assumption theory 

Janoff-Bulman, theorises that people generally hold three fundamental assumptions about the world that are built and confirmed over years of experience: the world is benevolent, the world is meaningful, and I am worthy.  According to the Shattered assumption theory, there are some extreme events that "shatter" an individuals worldviews by severely challenging and breaking assumptions about the world and ourself. Once one has experienced such trauma, it is necessary for and individual to create new assumptions or modify their old ones to recover from the traumatic experience. Therefore, the negative effects of the trauma are simply related to our worldviews, and if we repair these views, we will recover from the trauma.

In psychodynamics
Psychodynamic viewpoints are controversial, but have been shown to have utility therapeutically.

French neurologist, Jean-Martin Charcot, argued in the 1890s that psychological trauma was the origin of all instances of the mental illness known as hysteria.  Charcot's "traumatic hysteria" often manifested as paralysis that followed a physical trauma, typically years later after what Charcot described as a period of "incubation". Sigmund Freud, Charcot's student and the father of psychoanalysis, examined the concept of psychological trauma throughout his career.  Jean Laplanche has given a general description of Freud's understanding of trauma, which varied significantly over the course of Freud's career: "An event in the subject's life, defined by its intensity, by the subject's incapacity to respond adequately to it and by the upheaval and long-lasting effects that it brings about in the psychical organization".

The French psychoanalyst Jacques Lacan claimed that what he called "The Real" had a traumatic quality external to symbolization. As an object of anxiety, Lacan maintained that The Real is "the essential object which isn't an object any longer, but this something faced with which all words cease and all categories fail, the object of anxiety par excellence".

Fred Alford, citing the work of object relations theorist Donald Winnicott, uses the concept of inner other, and internal representation of the social world, with which one converses internally and which is generated through interactions with others. He posits that the inner other is damaged by trauma but can be repaired by conversations with others such as therapists. He relates the concept of the inner other to the work of Albert Camus viewing the inner other as that which removes the absurd. Alford notes how trauma damages trust in social relations due to fear of exploitation and argues that culture and social relations can help people recover from trauma.

Diana Fosha, a pioneer of modern psychodynamic perspective, also argues that social relations can help people recover from trauma, but specifically refers to attachment theory and the attachment dynamic of the therapeutic relationship. Fosha argues that the sense of emotional safety and co-regulation that occurs in a psychodynamically oriented therapeutic relationship acts as the secure attachment that is necessary to allow a client to experience and process through their trauma safely and effectively.

Diagnosis

As "trauma" adopted a more widely defined scope, traumatology as a field developed a more interdisciplinary approach. This is in part due to the field's diverse professional representation including: psychologists, medical professionals, and lawyers. As a result, findings in this field are adapted for various applications, from individual psychiatric treatments to sociological large-scale trauma management. While the field has adopted a number of diverse methodological approaches, many pose their own limitations in practical application.

The experience and outcomes of psychological trauma can be assessed in a number of ways. Within the context of a clinical interview, the risk of imminent danger to the self or others is important to address but is not the focus of assessment. In most cases, it will not be necessary to involve contacting emergency services (e.g., medical, psychiatric, law enforcement) to ensure the individuals safety; members of the individual's social support network are much more critical.

Understanding and accepting the psychological state of an individual is paramount. There are many misconceptions of what it means for a traumatized individual to be in psychological crisis. These are times when an individual is in inordinate amounts of pain and incapable of self-comfort. If treated humanely and respectfully the individual is less likely to resort to self harm. In these situations it is best to provide a supportive, caring environment and to communicate to the individual that no matter the circumstance, the individual will be taken seriously rather than being treated as delusional. It is vital for the assessor to understand that what is going on in the traumatized person's head is valid and real. If deemed appropriate, the assessing clinician may proceed by inquiring about both the traumatic event and the outcomes experienced (e.g., post-traumatic symptoms, dissociation, substance abuse, somatic symptoms, psychotic reactions). Such inquiry occurs within the context of established rapport and is completed in an empathic, sensitive, and supportive manner. The clinician may also inquire about possible relational disturbance, such as alertness to interpersonal danger, abandonment issues, and the need for self-protection via interpersonal control. Through discussion of interpersonal relationships, the clinician is better able to assess the individual's ability to enter and sustain a clinical relationship.

During assessment, individuals may exhibit activation responses in which reminders of the traumatic event trigger sudden feelings (e.g., distress, anxiety, anger), memories, or thoughts relating to the event. Because individuals may not yet be capable of managing this distress, it is necessary to determine how the event can be discussed in such a way that will not "retraumatize" the individual. It is also important to take note of such responses, as these responses may aid the clinician in determining the intensity and severity of possible post traumatic stress as well as the ease with which responses are triggered. Further, it is important to note the presence of possible avoidance responses. Avoidance responses may involve the absence of expected activation or emotional reactivity as well as the use of avoidance mechanisms (e.g., substance use, effortful avoidance of cues associated with the event, dissociation).

In addition to monitoring activation and avoidance responses, clinicians carefully observe the individual's strengths or difficulties with affect regulation (i.e., affect tolerance and affect modulation). Such difficulties may be evidenced by mood swings, brief yet intense depressive episodes, or self-mutilation. The information gathered through observation of affect regulation will guide the clinician's decisions regarding the individual's readiness to partake in various therapeutic activities.

Though assessment of psychological trauma may be conducted in an unstructured manner, assessment may also involve the use of a structured interview. Such interviews might include the Clinician-Administered PTSD Scale, Acute Stress Disorder Interview, Structured Interview for Disorders of Extreme Stress, Structured Clinical Interview for DSM-IV Dissociative Disorders - Revised, and Brief Interview for post-traumatic Disorders.

Lastly, assessment of psychological trauma might include the use of self-administered psychological tests. Individual scores on such tests are compared to normative data in order to determine how the individual's level of functioning compares to others in a sample representative of the general population. Psychological testing might include the use of generic tests (e.g., MMPI-2, MCMI-III, SCL-90-R) to assess non-trauma-specific symptoms as well as difficulties related to personality. In addition, psychological testing might include the use of trauma-specific tests to assess post-traumatic outcomes. Such tests might include the post-traumatic Stress Diagnostic Scale, Davidson Trauma Scale, Detailed Assessment of post-traumatic Stress, Trauma Symptom Inventory, Trauma Symptom Checklist for Children, Traumatic Life Events Questionnaire, and Trauma-related Guilt Inventory.

Children are assessed through activities and therapeutic relationship, some of the activities are play genogram, sand worlds, coloring feelings, self and kinetic family drawing, symbol work, dramatic-puppet play, story telling, Briere's TSCC, etc.

Definition
The Diagnostic and Statistical Manual of Mental Disorders, Fifth Edition (DSM-5) defines trauma as the symptoms that occur following exposure to an event (i.e., traumatic event) that involves actual or threatened death, serious injury, or sexual violence. This exposure could come in the form of experiencing the event, witnessing the event, or learning that the event was experienced by a family member or close associate. Trauma symptoms may come in the form of intrusive memories, dreams, or flashbacks; avoidance of reminders of the traumatic event; negative thoughts and feelings; or increased alertness or reactivity. Memories associated with trauma are typically explicit, coherent, and difficult to forget.  Due to the complexity of the interaction between traumatic event occurrence and trauma symptomatology, a person's distress response to aversive details of a traumatic event may involve intense fear or helplessness but ranges according to the context. In children, trauma symptoms can be manifested in the form of disorganized or agitative behaviors.

Trauma can be caused by a wide variety of events, but there are a few common aspects. There is frequently a violation of the person's core assumptions about the world and their human rights, putting the person in a state of extreme confusion and insecurity. This is seen when institutions depended upon for survival violate, humiliate, betray, or cause major losses or separations instead of evoking aspects like positive self worth, safe boundaries and personal freedom.

Psychologically traumatic experiences often involve physical trauma that threatens one's survival and sense of security. Typical causes and dangers of psychological trauma include harassment, embarrassment, abandonment, abusive relationships, rejection, co-dependence, physical assault, sexual abuse, partner battery, employment discrimination, police brutality, judicial corruption and misconduct, bullying, paternalism, domestic violence, indoctrination, being the victim of an alcoholic parent, the threat or the witnessing of violence (particularly in childhood), life-threatening medical conditions, and medication-induced trauma. Catastrophic natural disasters such as earthquakes and volcanic eruptions, large scale transportation accidents, house or domestic fire, motor vehicle accident, mass interpersonal violence like war, terrorist attacks or other mass victimization like sex trafficking, being taken as a hostage or being kidnapped can also cause psychological trauma. Long-term exposure to situations such as extreme poverty or other forms of abuse, such as verbal abuse, exist independently of physical trauma but still generate psychological trauma.

Some theories suggest childhood trauma can increase one's risk for mental disorders including post-traumatic stress disorder (PTSD), depression, and substance abuse. Childhood adversity is associated with neuroticism during adulthood. 
Parts of the brain in a growing child are developing in a sequential and hierarchical order, from least complex to most complex. The brain's neurons change in response to the constant external signals and stimulation, receiving and storing new information. This allows the brain to continually respond to its surroundings and promote survival. The five traditional signals (sight, hearing, taste, smell, and touch) contribute to the developing brain structure and its function. 
Infants and children begin to create internal representations of their external environment, and in particular, key attachment relationships, shortly after birth. Violent and victimizing attachment figures impact infants' and young children's internal representations. The more frequently a specific pattern of brain neurons is activated, the more permanent the internal representation associated with the pattern becomes. This causes sensitization in the brain towards the specific neural network. Because of this sensitization, the neural pattern can be activated by decreasingly less external stimuli. 
Childhood abuse tends to have the most complications with long-term effects out of all forms of trauma because it occurs during the most sensitive and critical stages of psychological development. It could also lead to violent behavior, possibly as extreme as serial murder. For example, Hickey's Trauma-Control Model suggests that "childhood trauma for serial murderers may serve as a triggering mechanism resulting in an individual's inability to cope with the stress of certain events."

Often, psychological aspects of trauma are overlooked even by health professionals: "If clinicians fail to look through a trauma lens and to conceptualize client problems as related possibly to current or past trauma, they may fail to see that trauma victims, young and old, organize much of their lives around repetitive patterns of reliving and warding off traumatic memories, reminders, and affects." Biopsychosocial models offer a broader view of health problems than biomedical models.

Effects 
Evidence suggests that a minority of people who experience severe trauma in adulthood will experience enduring personality change. Personality changes include guilt, distrust, impulsiveness, aggression, avoidance, obsessive behaviour, emotional numbness, loss of interest, hopelessness and altered self-perception.

Treatment

A number of psychotherapy approaches have been designed with the treatment of trauma in mind—EMDR, progressive counting (PC), somatic experiencing, biofeedback, Internal Family Systems Therapy, and sensorimotor psychotherapy, and Emotional Freedom Technique (EFT) etc. Trauma- and violence-informed care provides a framework for any person in any discipline or context to promote healing, or at least not re-traumatizing.

There is a large body of empirical support for the use of cognitive behavioral therapy  for the treatment of trauma-related symptoms, including post-traumatic stress disorder. Institute of Medicine guidelines identify cognitive behavioral therapies as the most effective treatments for PTSD. Two of these cognitive behavioral therapies, prolonged exposure and cognitive processing therapy, are being disseminated nationally by the Department of Veterans Affairs for the treatment of PTSD.   A 2010 Cochrane review found that trauma-focused cognitive behavioral therapy was effective for individuals with acute traumatic stress symptoms when compared to waiting list and supportive counseling.   Seeking Safety is another type of cognitive behavioral therapy that focuses on learning safe coping skills for co-occurring PTSD and substance use problems. While some sources highlight Seeking Safety as effective with strong research support, others have suggested that it did not lead to improvements beyond usual treatment. Recent studies show that a combination of treatments involving dialectical behavior therapy (DBT), often used for borderline personality disorder, and exposure therapy is highly effective in treating psychological trauma. If, however, psychological trauma has caused dissociative disorders or complex PTSD, the trauma model approach (also known as phase-oriented treatment of structural dissociation) has been proven to work better than the simple cognitive approach. Studies funded by pharmaceuticals have also shown that medications such as the new anti-depressants are effective when used in combination with other psychological approaches. At present, the selective serotonin reuptake inhibitor (SSRI) antidepressants sertraline (Zoloft) and paroxetine (Paxil) are the only medications that have been approved by the Food and Drug Administration (FDA) in the United States to treat PTSD. Other options for pharmacotherapy include serotonin-norepinephrine reuptake inhibitor (SNRI) antidepressants and anti-psychotic medications, though none have been FDA approved.

Trauma therapy allows processing trauma-related memories and allows growth towards more adaptive psychological functioning. It helps to develop positive coping instead of negative coping and allows the individual to integrate upsetting-distressing material (thoughts, feelings and memories) and to resolve these internally. It also aids in the growth of personal skills like resilience, ego regulation, empathy, etc.

Processes involved in trauma therapy are:

 Psychoeducation: Information dissemination and educating in vulnerabilities and adoptable coping mechanisms.
 Emotional regulation: Identifying, countering discriminating, grounding thoughts and emotions from internal construction to an external representation.
 Cognitive processing: Transforming negative perceptions and beliefs about self, others and environment to positive ones through cognitive reconsideration or re-framing.
 Trauma processing: Systematic desensitization, response activation and counter-conditioning, titrated extinction of emotional response, deconstructing disparity (emotional vs. reality state), resolution of traumatic material (in theory, to a state in which triggers no longer produce harmful distress and the individual is able to express relief.)
 Emotional processing: Reconstructing perceptions, beliefs and erroneous expectations, habituating new life contexts for auto-activated trauma-related fears, and providing crisis cards with coded emotions and appropriate cognition. (This stage is only initiated in pre-termination phase from clinical assessment and judgement of the mental health professional.)
 Experiential processing: Visualization of achieved relief state and relaxation methods.

A number of complementary approaches to trauma treatment have been implicated as well, including yoga and meditation. There has been recent interest in developing trauma-sensitive yoga practices, but the actual efficacy of yoga in reducing the effects of trauma needs more exploration.

In health and social care settings, a trauma informed approach means that care is underpinned by understandings of trauma and its far-reaching implications. Trauma is widespread. For example, 26% of participants in the Adverse Childhood Experiences (ACEs) study were survivors of one ACE and 12.5% were survivors of four or more ACEs. A trauma-informed approach acknowledges the high rates of trauma and means that care providers treat every person as if they might be a survivor of trauma. Measurement of the effectiveness of a universal trauma informed approach is in early stages  and is largely based in theory and epidemiology.

Trauma informed teaching practice is an educative approach for migrant children from war-torn countries, who have typically experienced complex trauma, and the number of such children entering Canadian schools has led some school jurisdictions to consider new classroom approaches to assist these pupils. Along with complex trauma, these students often have experienced interrupted schooling due to the migration process, and as a consequence may have limited literacy skills in their first language. One study of a Canadian secondary school classroom, as told through journal entries of a  student teacher, showed how Blaustein and Kinniburgh's ARC (attachment, regulation and competency) framework was used to support newly arrived refugee students from war zones. Tweedie et al. (2017) describe how key components of the ARC framework, such as establishing consistency in classroom routines; assisting students to identify and self-regulate emotional responses; and enabling student personal goal achievement, are practically applied in one classroom where students have experienced complex trauma. The authors encourage teachers and schools to avoid a deficit lens to view such pupils, and suggest ways schools can structure teaching and learning environments which take into account the extreme stresses these students have encountered.

Society and culture 
Some people, and many self-help books, use the word trauma broadly, to refer to any unpleasant experience, even if the affected person has a psychologically healthy response to the experience.  This imprecise language may promote the medicalization of normal human behaviors (e.g., grief after a death) and make discussions of psychological trauma more complex, but it might also encourage people to respond with compassion to the distress and suffering of others.

See also

References

Further reading

External links
 
 The International Society for Traumatic Stress Studies (ISTSS)
 Trauma-Focused Cognitive Behavioral Therapy – Medical University of South Carolina
 National Child Traumatic Stress Network (NCTSN)
 Trauma Information Pages

Psychological stress
Abuse
Bullying
Counseling
Anxiety disorders
Post-traumatic stress disorder
Victimology
Trauma types
Adverse childhood experiences